Novy is a rural locality (a selo) under the administrative jurisdiction of the Settlement of Almazny in Mirninsky District of the Sakha Republic, Russia, located  from Mirny, the administrative center of the district and  from Almazny. Its population as of the 2010 Census was 76; down from 242 recorded during the 2002 Census.

References

Notes

Sources
Official website of the Sakha Republic. Registry of the Administrative-Territorial Divisions of the Sakha Republic. Mirninsky District. 

Rural localities in Mirninsky District